Bruce Williamson is an American diplomat who served as the United States' Chargé d'affaires to Bolivia from 2017 to 2020.

Early life

Bruce Williamson was born in Philadelphia, Pennsylvania. He graduated with a Bachelor of Arts from Yale University, a Juris Doctor from Harvard Law School, and a Master's degree from the National War College. He is married and has one child.

Chargé d'affaires to Bolivia (2017–2020) 

Williamson served as Deputy Chief of Mission and Chargé d’Affaires in Guatemala, Deputy Chief of Mission in Peru, and Principal Officer in Monterrey, Mexico. From December 2014 to September 2017, Williamson served as the Deputy Assistant Secretary in the Department of State’s Bureau of Human Resources.

On December 20, 2017, he arrived in La Paz, Bolivia, and presented his credentials to take the position of the United States' Chargé d'affaires to Bolivia.

References

21st-century American diplomats
American consuls
Ambassadors of the United States to Bolivia
Harvard Law School alumni
Living people
National War College alumni
People from Philadelphia
Yale College alumni
Year of birth missing (living people)